The Breaza is a left tributary of the river Olt in Romania. It discharges into the Olt in Voila. Its source is in the Făgăraș Mountains.

References

Rivers of Romania
Rivers of Brașov County